The Paleobiology Database is an online resource for information on the distribution and classification of fossil animals, plants, and microorganisms.

History
The Paleobiology Database (PBDB) originated in the NCEAS-funded Phanerozoic Marine Paleofaunal Database initiative, which operated from August 1998 through August 2000. From 2000 to 2015, PBDB received funding from the National Science Foundation. PBDB also received support form the  Australian Research Council. From 2000 to 2010 it was housed at the National Center for Ecological Analysis and Synthesis, a cross-disciplinary research center within the University of California, Santa Barbara. It is currently housed at University of Wisconsin-Madison and overseen by an international committee of major data contributors.

The Paleobiology Database works closely with the Neotoma Paleoecology Database, which has a similar intellectual history, but has focused on the Quaternary (with an emphasis on the late Pleistocene and Holocene) at timescales of decades to millennia. Together, Neotoma and the Paleobiology Database have helped launch the EarthLife Consortium, a non-profit umbrella organization to support the easy and free sharing of paleoecological and paleobiological data.

Researchers
Partial list of contributing researchers:
Martin Aberhan, Museum für Naturkunde
John Alroy, Macquarie University
Chris Beard, Carnegie Museum of Natural History
Kay Behrensmeyer, Smithsonian Institution
David Bottjer, University of Southern California
Richard Butler, Bayerische Staatssammlung für Paläontologie und Geologie
Matt Carrano, Smithsonian Institution
Fabrizio Cecca, Pierre-and-Marie-Curie University
Matthew Clapham, University of California, Santa Cruz
Bill DiMichele, Smithsonian Institution
Michael Foote, University of Chicago
Austin Hendy, Smithsonian Tropical Research Institute
Steve Holland, University of Georgia
Wolfgang Kiessling, Museum für Naturkunde
Charles R. Marshall, University of California, Berkeley
Alistair McGowan, University of Glasgow
Arnie Miller, University of Cincinnati
Johannes Müller, Museum für Naturkunde
Mark Patzkowsky, Penn State
Hermann Pfefferkorn, University of Pennsylvania
Ashwini Srivastava, Birbal Sahni Institute of Palaeobotany
Alan Turner, Liverpool John Moores University
Mark D. Uhen, George Mason University
Loïc Vilier, Université de Provence
Pete Wagner, Smithsonian Institution
Xiaoming Wang, Natural History Museum of Los Angeles County
Robin Whatley, Smithsonian Institution
Scott Wing, Smithsonian Institution

Institutions
Partial list of contributing institutions:
All-Russian Geological Research Institute
Bayerische Staatssammlung für Paläontologie und Geologie
Benedictine University
Binghamton University
Birbal Sahni Institute of Palaeobotany
Carnegie Museum of Natural History
Case Western Reserve University
Colby College
College of William and Mary
Denver Museum of Nature and Science
Field Museum of Natural History
George Mason University
Harvard University
Hungarian Natural History Museum
Museum für Naturkunde
National Center for Biotechnology Information
Natural History Museum of Los Angeles County
Ohio State University
Penn State
Smithsonian Institution
Smithsonian Tropical Research Institute
Université de Provence
University of California, Berkeley
University of California, Santa Cruz
University of Chicago
University of Cincinnati
University of Florida
University of Georgia
University of Southern California
University of Texas
University of Washington
University of Wisconsin
University of Würzburg
Yale University

See also 
 Fossilworks

References

External links 

Online taxonomy databases
Paleontology websites